Virginia Waters-Pleasantville is a provincial electoral district in Newfoundland and Labrador. As of 2011 there are 14,152 people living in the district.

Virginia Waters-Pleasantville includes part of the city of St. John's. The district was created following the 2015 electoral districts boundaries review. The district includes parts of the former districts of St. John's East, Signal Hill-Quidi Vidi, and Virginia Waters.

Members of the House of Assembly
The district has elected the following Members of the House of Assembly:

Election results

References

Newfoundland and Labrador provincial electoral districts
Politics of St. John's, Newfoundland and Labrador